The region known as Cabeça do Cachorro (Dog‘s head) is the area comprising the northwesternmost end of the state of Amazonas, Brazil, bordering on Colombia and Venezuela.

This region roughly coincides with the Brazilian municipality of São Gabriel da Cachoeira and parts of Japurá, and shares international borders with the Venezuelan state of Amazonas (to the northeast), and the Colombian departments of Guainía (to north), Vaupés (to west) and Amazonas (to southwest). The Brazilian Army maintains a border platoon next to the border tripoint, at the village of Cucuí, where there is also a Brazilian Air Force base.

Cabeça do Cachorro means, literally, "Dog's Head" in Portuguese. The name was given after the shape of this region's map, that resembles the head of a dog with its mouth wide open. This picturesque geographical shape was defined by the Treaty of Bogotá, which was signed by Colombia and Brazil in 1907 and defined the borders between the two countries according to the uti possidetis criterium. These borders were later confirmed by a supplementary Colombian-Brazilian treaty in 1928.

The area has several Amerindian reservations. The municipality of São Gabriel da Cachoeira, in Cabeça do Cachorro, is the first in Brazil to adopt an Amerindian language, Nheengatu, as co-official with Portuguese.

The region also has one of the largest niobium reserves in the world.

See also
Brazilian state of Amazonas
Municipality of São Gabriel da Cachoeira
Municipality of Japurá
Colombia-Brazil borders
Roman Catholic Diocese of São Gabriel da Cachoeira

External links
Geodesic points of the border between Brazil and Colombia
Health and Displacement at the border between Brazil and Colombia
Fronteira Brasil-Colômbia: Breve Histórico (in Portuguese)
Tratado de Bogotá, 21 de abril de 1907 (in Portuguese)

Ecoregions of Brazil
North Region, Brazil
Regions of South America